Peter Henderson (born 29 September 1952) is an English former professional footballer who mainly played as a winger. He played in The Football League for three clubs, with most of his appearances being made for Chester.

Playing career
Henderson was 26 before he made his breakthrough into The Football League, when he joined Chester from Witton Albion in December 1978. He had previously spent time on the books of Manchester City without making a first-team appearance and worked as a teacher of physical education in Winsford.

He made his Football League debut for Chester in a 2–1 defeat at Peterborough United on 13 January 1979, with his first goal following four days later against Colchester United. He remained a regular for the rest of the season, scoring a hat-trick in a 5–1 win over Lincoln City in March 1979. The following season saw Chester reach the FA Cup fifth round, with Henderson opening the scoring in a shock 2–0 win at Newcastle United in round three. This goal was unfortunately missed by many travelling Chester fans as their train arrived late.

Henderson left Chester at the end of the season for Gillingham, but after an injury hit spell at Priestfield Stadium and a brief loan stint with Crewe Alexandra, he returned to Chester in December 1981. He left the club at the end of the season, playing his final Football League fixture in a 1–0 loss at home to Carlisle United on 19 May 1982.

As well as training as a physiotherapist, Henderson played for non-league sides Telford United, Northwich Victoria, Runcorn, Winsford United and Oswestry Town. In 1986, he became physiotherapist at Birmingham City, and went on to become part of Lou Macari's coaching staff at clubs including Stoke City and Celtic.

References

External links
Witton Albion history featuring Henderson

1952 births
Living people
People from Berwick-upon-Tweed
English footballers
Association football wingers
English Football League players
National League (English football) players
Manchester City F.C. players
Witton Albion F.C. players
Chester City F.C. players
Gillingham F.C. players
Crewe Alexandra F.C. players
Telford United F.C. players
Northwich Victoria F.C. players
Runcorn F.C. Halton players
Winsford United F.C. players
Oswestry Town F.C. players
Association football physiotherapists
Celtic F.C. non-playing staff
Stoke City F.C. non-playing staff
Footballers from Northumberland